Anders Been later Andreas von Behn (1650-1730), was a Norwegian painter and court dwarf in service of the Swedish queen dowager Hedwig Eleonora of Holstein-Gottorp.

Been was originally from Norway. He was placed in the service of the Swedish Queen Dowager, who had several court dwarfs in her household. In Sweden he was often referred to as "The Dwarf from Norway".  His actual tasks have been described as "somewhere between that of a valet and a barber". 

He was an active painter and is known to have decorated some of the cabinets at Drottningholm Palace. Eventually, Queen Dowager had him ennobled. In 1709, Been left Sweden furnished with travel funds from the Queen.

References

17th-century Norwegian painters
18th-century Norwegian painters
18th-century male artists
People with dwarfism
Swedish royal favourites
Swedish courtiers
1650 births
1730 deaths
Norwegian male painters
Norwegian expatriates in Sweden